Peterstone or Peterstone Wentlooge is a small hamlet to the south west of the city of Newport, South Wales.

Location 
Peterstone Wentlooge lies six miles to the west of Newport city centre and 7½ miles east of Cardiff city centre.

It lies in the community parish of Wentloog and electoral ward of Marshfield.

History and amenities 
Like most of the settlements on the Wentlooge Level it lies on land reclaimed from the Bristol Channel .

The former parish church, St Peter's is now a private house..

A local pub is the Six Bells .

Manor claim 2004 
The village became the focal point of press attention in 2004 as Mark Roberts had previously bought the Lord of the Manor title and then went to charge villagers excessive fees to cross what had always been used freely as their own land. Matters were raised in parliament and were debated with a reply on the subject from the Parliamentary Under-Secretary of State for Constitutional Affairs acknowledging 'need for reform of the remnants of feudal and manorial law'.

See also
Peterstone Gout

References

External links

Villages in Newport, Wales